James Van Alen may refer to:

James Henry Van Alen (1819–1886), American Civil War brigadier general
James I. Van Alen (1772–1822), American politician
James J. Van Alen (1848–1923), American sportsman and politician
Jimmy Van Alen (1902–1991), American tennis player

See also
James Van Allen (1914–2006), American space scientist